The four-way valve or four-way cock is a fluid control valve whose body has four ports equally spaced round the valve chamber and the plug has two passages to connect adjacent ports. The plug may be cylindrical or tapered, or a ball.

It has two flow positions, and usually a central position where all ports are closed. 

It can be used to isolate and to simultaneously bypass a sampling cylinder installed on a pressurized water line. It is useful to take a fluid sample without affecting the pressure of a hydraulic system and to avoid degassing (no leak, no gas loss or air entry, no external contamination).

It was used to control the flow of steam to the cylinder of early double-acting steam engines, such as those designed by Richard Trevithick. This use of the valve is possibly attributable to Denis Papin. 

Because the two "L"-shaped passages in the plug do not interconnect, the four-way valve is sometimes referred to as an "×" port.

See also
Ball valve

Valves